Food additives are substances added to food to preserve flavor or enhance its taste, appearance, or other qualities.

Purposes

Additives are used for many purposes but the main uses are:

Acids  Food acids are added to make flavors "sharper", and also act as preservatives and antioxidants. Common food acids include vinegar, citric acid, tartaric acid, malic acid, folic acid, fumaric acid, and lactic acid.
Acidic
Acidity regulators  Acidity regulators are used to change or otherwise control the acidity and alkalinity of foods.
Anticaking agents  Anticaking agents keep powders such as milk powder from caking or sticking.
Antifoaming agents  Antifoaming agents reduce or prevent foaming in foods.
Antioxidants  Antioxidants such as vitamin C act as preservatives by inhibiting the effects of oxygen on food, and can be beneficial to health.
Bulking agents  Bulking agents such as starch are additives that increase the bulk of a food without affecting its nutritional value.
Food coloring  Colorings are added to food to replace colors lost during preparation, or to make food look more attractive.
Color retention agents  In contrast to colorings, color retention agents are used to preserve a food's existing color.
Emulsifiers  Emulsifiers allow water and oils to remain mixed together in an emulsion, as in mayonnaise, ice cream, and homogenized milk.
Flavors  Flavors are additives that give food a particular taste or smell, and may be derived from natural ingredients or created artificially.
Flavor enhancers  Flavor enhancers enhance a food's existing flavors. They may be extracted from natural sources (through distillation, solvent extraction, maceration, among other methods) or created artificially.
Flour treatment agents  Flour treatment agents are added to flour to improve its color or its use in baking.
Glazing agents Glazing agents provide a shiny appearance or protective coating to foods.
Humectants  Humectants prevent foods from drying out.
Tracer gas Tracer gas allow for package integrity testing to prevent foods from being exposed to atmosphere, thus guaranteeing shelf life.
Preservatives  Preservatives prevent or inhibit spoilage of food due to fungi, bacteria and other microorganisms.
Stabilizers  Stabilizers, thickeners and gelling agents, like agar or pectin (used in jam for example) give foods a firmer texture. While they are not true emulsifiers, they help to stabilize emulsions.
Sweeteners  Sweeteners are added to foods for flavoring. Sweeteners other than sugar are added to keep the food energy (calories) low, or because they have beneficial effects for diabetes mellitus and tooth decay.
Thickeners  Thickeners are substances which, when added to the mixture, increase its viscosity without substantially modifying its other properties.

Caffeine and other GRAS (generally recognized as safe) additives such as sugar and
salt are not required to go through the regulation process.

Alphabetical index of food additives


0–9
 1,4-heptonolactone – food acid *
 2-hydroxybiphenyl – preservative

A 
 Abietic acid –
 Acacia vera –
 Acacia –
 Acesulfame potassium – artificial sweetener
 Acesulfame –
 Acetic acid – acidity regulator
 Acetic acid esters of mono- and diglycerides of fatty acids – emulsifier
 Acetone
 Acetylated distarch adipate – thickener, vegetable gum
 Acetylated distarch phosphate – thickener, vegetable gum
 Acetylated oxidised starch – thickener, vegetable gum
 Acetylated starch – thickener, vegetable gum
 Acid treated starch – thickener, vegetable gum
 Adipic acid – food acid
 Agar – thickener, vegetable gum, stabilizer, gelling agent
 Alcohol –
 Alfalfa –
 Alginic acid – thickener, vegetable gum, stabilizer, gelling agent, emulsifier
 Alitame – artificial sweetener
 Alkaline treated starch – thickener, vegetable gum
 Alkanet – color (red)
 Allspice –
 Allura red AC – color (FDA: FD&C Red #40)
 Almond oil – used as a substitute for olive oil. Also used as an emollient.
 Aluminium – color (silver)
 Aluminium ammonium sulfate – mineral salt
 Aluminium potassium sulfate – mineral salt
 Aluminium silicate – anti-caking agent
 Aluminium sodium sulfate – mineral salt
 Aluminium sulfate – mineral salt
 Amaranth – color (red) (FDA: [DELISTED] Red #2) Note that amaranth dye is unrelated to the amaranth plant
 Amaranth oil – high in squalene and unsaturated fatty acids – used in food and cosmetic industries.
 Amchur (mango powder)
 Ammonium acetate – preservative, acidity regulator
 Ammonium adipates – acidity regulator
 Ammonium alginate – thickener, vegetable gum, stabilizer, gelling agent, emulsifier
 Ammonium bicarbonate – mineral salt
 Ammonium carbonate – mineral salt
 Ammonium chloride – mineral salt
 Ammonium ferric citrate – food acid
 Ammonium fumarate – food acid
 Ammonium hydroxide – mineral salt
 Ammonium lactate – food acid
 Ammonium malate – food acid
 Ammonium phosphates – mineral salt
 Ammonium phosphatides – emulsifier
 Ammonium polyphosphates – anti-caking agent
 Ammonium sulfate – mineral salt, improving agent
 Amylases – flour treatment agent
 Angelica (Angelica archangelica)
 Anise –
 Annatto – color
 Anthocyanins – color
 Apricot oil – a cooking oil from certain cultivars.
 Arabinogalactan – thickener, vegetable gum
 Argan oil – a food oil from Morocco that has also attracted recent attention in Europe.
 Argon – propellant
 Rocket (Arugula)
 Asafoetida –
 Ascorbic acid (Vitamin C) – antioxidant (water-soluble)
 Ascorbyl palmitate – antioxidant (fat soluble)
 Ascorbyl stearate – antioxidant (fat soluble)
 Aspartame – artificial sweetener
 Astaxanthin – color
 Avocado oil – used a substitute for olive oil. Also used in cosmetics and skin care products.
 Azodicarbonamide – flour bleaching agent. Also used in the production of foamed plastics and the manufacture of gaskets. Banned as a food additive in Australia and Europe.
 Azorubine – color (red) (FDA: Ext D&C Red #10)

B 
 Babassu oil – similar to, and used as a substitute for coconut oil.
 Baking powder – leavening agent; includes acid and base
 Baking soda – food base
 Balm, lemon –
 Balm oil –
 Balsam of Peru – used in food and drink for flavoring
 Barberry –
 Barley flour –
 Basil (Ocimum basilicum) –
 Basil extract –
 Bay leaves –
 Beeswax – glazing agent
 Beet red – color (red)
 Beetroot red – color (red)
 Ben oil – extracted from the seeds of the moringa oleifera. High in behenic acid. Extremely stable edible oil. Also suitable for biofuel.
 Bentonite – anti-caking agent
 Benzoic acid – preservative
 Benzoyl peroxide – flour treatment agent
 Berebere –
 Bergamot – in Earl Grey tea
 Beta-apo-8'-carotenal (C 30) – color
 Beta-apo-8'-carotenic acid ethyl ester – color
 Betanin – color (red)
 Biphenyl – preservative
 Bison grass (Hierochloe odorata)
 Bixin – color
 Black 7984 – color (brown and black)
 Black cardamom –
 Black cumin –
 Blackcurrant seed oil – used as a food supplement, because of high content of omega-3 and omega-6 fatty acids. Also used in cosmetics.
 Black limes –
 Pepper (black, white, and green) –
 Black PN – color (brown and black)
 Bleached starch – thickener, vegetable gum
 Bolivian Coriander (Porophyllum ruderale) –
 Bone phosphate – anti-caking agent
 Borage (Borago officinalis) –
 Borage seed oil – similar to blackcurrant seed oil – used primarily medicinally.
 Borax – 
 Boric acid – preservative
 Brilliant Black BN- color (brown and black)
 Brilliant blue FCF – color (FDA: FD&C Blue #1)
 Brilliant Scarlet 4R – color (FDA: Ext D&C Red #8)
 Brominated vegetable oil – emulsifier, stabiliser
 Brown FK – color (brown and black)
 Bush tomato –
 Butane – propellant
 Butylated hydroxyanisole (BHA) – antioxidant (fat soluble)
 Butylated hydroxytoluene (BHT) – antioxidant (fat soluble)

C 
 Cacao shell –
 Cachou extract –
 Cactus root extract –
 Cadinene –
 Caffeine – stimulant
 Cajeput oil –
 Calamus –
 Calcium 5'-ribonucleotides – flavor enhancer
 Calcium acetate – preservative, acidity regulator
 Calcium alginate – thickener, vegetable gum, stabilizer, gelling agent, emulsifier
 Calcium ascorbate – antioxidant (water-soluble)
 Calcium aluminosilicate (calcium aluminium silicate) – anti-caking agent
 Calcium ascorbate (Vitamin C)
 Calcium benzoate – preservative
 Calcium bisulfite – preservative, antioxidant
 Calcium carbonates – color (white), anticaking agent, stabiliser
 Calcium chloride – mineral salt
 Calcium citrates – food acid, firming agent
 Calcium diglutamate – flavor enhancer
 Calcium disodium EDTA – preservative
 Calcium ferrocyanide – anti-caking agent
 Calcium formate – preservative
 Calcium fumarate – food acid
 Calcium gluconate – acidity regulator
 Calcium guanylate – flavor enhancer
 Calcium hydrogen sulfite – preservative, antioxidant
 Calcium hydroxide – mineral salt
 Calcium inosinate – flavor enhancer
 Calcium lactate – food acid
 Calcium lactobionate – stabilizer
 Calcium malates – food acid
 Calcium oxide – mineral salt
 Calcium pantothenate (Vitamin B5)
 Calcium peroxide –
 Calcium phosphates – mineral salt, anti-caking agent, firming agent
 Calcium polyphosphates – anti-caking agent
 Calcium propionate – preservative
 Calcium salts of fatty acids – emulsifier, stabiliser, anti-caking agent
 Calcium silicate – anti-caking agent
 Calcium sorbate – preservative
 Calcium stearoyl lactylate – emulsifier
 Calcium sulfate – flour treatment agent, mineral salt, sequestrant, improving agent, firming agent
 Calcium sulfite – preservative, antioxidant
 Calcium tartrate – food acid, emulsifier
 Camomile –
 Candelilla wax – glazing agent
 Candle nut –
 Canola oil/Rapeseed oil, one of the most widely used cooking oils, from a (trademarked) cultivar of rapeseed.
 Canthaxanthin – color
 Caper (Capparis spinosa)
 Caprylic acid - preservative
 Capsanthin – color
 Capsorubin – color
 Carrageenan – A family of linear sulphated polysaccharides extracted from red seaweeds.
 Caramel I (plain) – color (brown and black)
 Caramel II (Caustic Sulfite process) – color (brown and black)
 Caramel III (Ammonia process) – color (brown and black)
 Caramel IV (Ammonia sulfite process) – color (brown and black)
 Caraway –
 Carbamide – flour treatment agent
 Carbon black – color (brown and black)
 Carbon dioxide – acidity regulator, propellant
 Cardamom –
 carmines – color (red)
 Carmoisine – color (red) (FDA: Ext D&C Red #10)
 Carnauba wax – glazing agent
 Carob pod –
 Carob pod oil/Algaroba oil, used medicinally.
 Carotenes – color
 Alpha-carotene – color
 Beta-carotene – color
 Gamma-carotene – color
 Carrageenan – thickener, vegetable gum, stabilizer, gelling agent, emulsifier
 Carrot oil –
 Cashew oil – somewhat comparable to olive oil. May have value for fighting dental cavities. 
 Cassia –
 Catechu extract –
 Celery salt –
 Celery seed –
 Wheat germ oil – used as a food supplement, and for its "grainy" flavor. Also used medicinally. Highly unstable.
 Chalk – color (white), anticaking agent, stabiliser
 Chervil (Anthriscus cerefolium) –
 Chicory –
 Chicory Root Extract – High in Inulin
 Chile pepper –
 Chili powder –
 Chives (Allium schoenoprasum) –
 Chlorine dioxide – flour treatment agent
 Chlorine – flour treatment agent
 Chlorophylls and Chlorophyllins – color (green)
 Chocolate Brown HT – color
 Choline salts and esters – emulsifier
 Chrysoine resorcinol – color (red)
 Cicely (Myrrhis odorata)
 Sweet cicely (Myrrhis odorata)
 Cilantro (see Coriander) (Coriandrum sativum)
 Cinnamon –
 Cinnamon oil – used for flavoring.
 Citranaxanthin – color
 Citric acid – food acid
 Citric acid esters of mono- and diglycerides of fatty acids – emulsifier
 Citrus red 2 – color (red)
 Cloves –
 Cochineal – color (red)
 Coconut oil – a cooking oil, high in saturated fat – particularly used in baking and cosmetics.
 Sage (Salvia officinalis) –
 Copper complexes of chlorophylls – color (green)
 Coriander –
 Coriander seed oil – used medicinally. Also used as a flavoring agent in pharmaceutical and food industries.
 Corn oil – one of the most common, and inexpensive cooking oils.
 Corn syrup –
 Cottonseed oil – a major food oil, often used in industrial food processing.
 Cress –
 Crocetin – color
 Crocin – color
 Crosslinked Sodium carboxymethylcellulose – emulsifier
 Cryptoxanthin – color
 Cumin –
 Cumin oil/Black seed oil – used as a flavor, particularly in meat products. Also used in veterinary medicine.
 Cupric sulfate – mineral salt
 Curcumin – color (yellow and orange)
 Curry powder –
 Curry leaf (Murraya koenigii) –
 Cyanocobalamin (Vitamin B12) –
 Cyclamates – artificial sweetener
 Cyclamic acid – artificial sweetener
 beta-cyclodextrin – emulsifier
 Lemongrass (Cymbopogon citratus, C. flexuosus, and other species) –

D 
 Damiana (Turnera aphrodisiaca, T. diffusa) –
 Dandelion leaf –
 Dandelion Root –
 Dandelion (Taraxacum officinale) –
 Decanal dimethyl acetal –
 Decanal –
 Decanoic acid –
 Dehydroacetic acid – preservative
 Delta-tocopherol(synthetic) – antioxidant
 Devil's claw (Harpagophytum procumbens) medicinal
 Dextrin roasted starch – thickener, vegetable gum
 Diacetyltartaric acid esters of mono- and diglycerides of fatty acids – emulsifier
 Dicalcium diphosphate – anti-caking agent
 Dilauryl thiodipropionate – antioxidant
 Dill seed –
 Dill (Anethum graveolens) –
 Dimethyl dicarbonate – preservative
 Dimethylpolysiloxane – emulsifier, anti-caking agent
 Dioctyl sodium sulfosuccinate – emulsifier
 Diphenyl – preservative
 Diphosphates – mineral salt, emulsifier
 Dipotassium guanylate – flavor enhancer
 Dipotassium inosinate – flavor enhancer
 Disodium 5'-ribonucleotides – flavor enhancer
 Disodium ethylenediaminetetraacetate – antioxidant, preservative
 Disodium guanylate – flavor enhancer
 Disodium inosinate – flavor enhancer
 Distarch phosphate – thickener, vegetable gum
 Distearyl thiodipropionate – antioxidant
 Dl-alpha-tocopherol (synthetic) – antioxidant
 Dodecyl gallate – antioxidant

E 
 Echinacea –
 EDTA – Antioxidant, Chelating Agent
 Egg –
 Egg yolk –
 Egg white –
 Elderberry –
 Eleutherococcus senticosus –
 Enzymatically hydrolyzed Carboxymethyl cellulose – emulsifier
 Enzyme treated starch – thickener, vegetable gum
 Epazote (Chenopodium ambrosioides)
 Epsom salts – mineral salt, acidity regulator, firming agent
 Erythorbic acid – antioxidant
 Erythrosine – color (red) (FDA: FD&C Red #3)
 Erythritol – sweetener
 Ethanol (alcohol) –
 Ethoxyquin - antioxidant, preservative
 Ethyl maltol – flavor enhancer
 Ethyl methyl cellulose – thickener, vegetable gum, emulsifier
 Ethylparaben (ethyl para-hydroxybenzoate) – preservative
 Ethylenediamine tetraacetic acid –
 Evening primrose oil – used as a food supplement for its purported medicinal properties.

F  
 False flax oil – made of the seeds of Camelina sativa. Can be considered as a food or fuel oil.
 Fantesk –
 Farnesol –
 Fast green FCF – color (FDA: FD&C Green #3)
 Fat –
 Flavoxanthin – color
 Fennel (Foeniculum vulgare)
 Fenugreek –
 Ferric ammonium citrate – food acid
 Ferrous gluconate – color retention agent
 Ferrous lactate –
 Filé powder –
 Five-spice powder (Chinese) –
 Fo-ti-tieng –
 Formaldehyde – preservative
 Formic acid – preservative
 Fructose –
 Fumaric acid – acidity regulator
 Folic acid- fortyfying agent

G 
 Galangal –
 Galangal root –
 Galbanum oil –
 Gallic acid –
 Gamma-tocopherol(synthetic) – antioxidant
 Garam masala –
 Garlic extract –
 Garlic –
 Garlic oil –
 Gelatin/gelatine – Gelling agent, emulsifier
 Gellan gum – thickener, vegetable gum, stabilizer, emulsifier
 Ginger –
 Ginger oil –
 Ginger root –
 Ginseng –
 Glacial Acetic acid – preservative, acidity regulator
 Glucitol –
 Gluconate –
 Glucono delta-lactone – acidity regulator
 Glucose oxidase – antioxidant
 Glucose syrup – sweetener
 Glutamate –
 Glutamic acid – flavor enhancer
 Gluten –
 Glycerin – humectant, sweetener
 Glycerol –
 Glycerol ester of wood rosin – emulsifier
 Glyceryl distearate – emulsifier
 Glyceryl monostearate – emulsifier
 Glycine – flavor enhancer
 Glyoxylic acid –
 Gold – color (gold)
 Grains of paradise –
 Grape color extract –
 Grape seed oil – suitable for cooking at high temperatures. Also used as a salad oil, and in cosmetics.
 Green S – color (green)
 Green tea –
 Guanylic acid – flavor enhancer
 Guar gum – thickener, vegetable gum, stabilizer
 Guaranine –
 Gum arabic / Gum acacia / E414 – thickener, vegetable gum, stabilizer, emulsifier
 Gum guaicum – preservative

H 
 Haw bark –
 Hazelnut oil – used for its flavor. Also used in skin care, because of its slight astringent nature.
 Heliotropin –
 Helium – propellant
 Hemlock oil –
 Hemp oil – a high quality food oil.
 Heptyl p-hydroxybenzoate – preservative
 Hesperidin –
 Hexamine (hexamethylene tetramine) – preservative
 Hexyl acetate –
 High fructose corn syrup –
 Horseradish –
 Hydrochloric acid – acidity regulator
 Hydroxypropyl cellulose – thickener, vegetable gum, emulsifier
 Hydroxypropyl distarch phosphate – thickener, vegetable gum
 Hydroxypropyl methylcellulose – thickener, vegetable gum, emulsifier
 Hydroxypropyl starch – thickener, vegetable gum
 Hyssop (Hyssopus officinalis) –

I 
 Indanthrene blue RS – color (blue)
 Indigo carmine – color (blue) (FDA: FD&C Blue #2)
 Indigotine – color (blue) (FDA: FD&C Blue #2)
 Indole –
 Inosinate –
 Inosinic acid – flavor enhancer
 Inositol –
 Insoluble fiber –
 Intense sweeteners –
 Inulin
 Invert sugar –
 Invertase –
 Iron ammonium citrate –
 Iron –
 Iron oxides and hydroxides – color
 Isobutane – propellant
 Isomalt – humectant
 Isopropyl citrates – antioxidant, preservative

J 
 Jasmine –
 Jamaican jerk spice –
 Jasmine absolute –
 Jiaogulan (Gynostemma pentaphyllum) –
 Juniper –
 Juniper berry –
 Juniper berry oil – used as a flavor. Also used medicinally, including traditional medicine.
 Juniper extract –

K 
 Kaffir Lime Leaves (Citrus hystrix, C. papedia) –
 Kaolin – anti-caking agent
 Kapok seed oil – used as an edible oil, and in soap production.
 Karaya gum – thickener, vegetable gum, stabilizer, emulsifier
 Kelp –
 Kokam –
 Kola nut extract –
 Konjac – thickener, vegetable gum
 Konjac glucomannate – thickener, vegetable gum
 Konjac gum – thickener, vegetable gum

L 
 L-cysteine – flour treatment agent
 Lactic acid – acidity regulator, preservative, antioxidant
 Lactic acid esters of mono- and diglycerides of fatty acids – emulsifier
 Lactitol – humectant
 Lactose –
 Lactylated fatty acid esters of glycerol and propylene glycol – emulsifier
 Larch gum –
 Lard –
 Latolrubine – color
 Laurel berry –
 Laurel leaf oil –
 Lavender (Lavandula spp.)
 Lavender oil –
 Lecithins – antioxidant, Emulsifier
 Lecithin citrate – preservative
 Lemon –
 Lemon balm (Melissa officinalis) –
 Lemon extract –
 Lemon juice –
 Lemon Myrtle (Backhousia citriodora) –
 Lemon oil –
 Lemon verbena (Lippia citriodora) –
 Lemongrass Oil –
 Leucine – flavor enhancer
 Licorice –
 Lipases – flavor enhancer
 Lithol Rubine BK – color
 Litholrubine – color
 Locust bean gum – thickener, vegetable gum, stabilizer, gelling agent, emulsifier
 Long pepper –
 Lovage (Levisticum officinale) –
 L(+)-Tartaric acid – food acid
 Lutein – color
 Lycopene – color
 Lysine –
 Lysozyme – preservative

M 
 Macadamia oil – used as an edible oil. Also used as a massage oil.
 Mace –
 Magnesium –
 Magnesium carbonate – anti-caking agent, mineral salt
 Magnesium chloride – mineral salt
 Magnesium citrate – acidity regulator
 Magnesium diglutamate – flavor enhancer
 Magnesium hydroxide – mineral salt
 Magnesium lactate – food acid
 Magnesium oxide – anti-caking agent
 Magnesium phosphates – mineral salt, anti-caking agent
 Magnesium salts of fatty acids – emulsifier, stabiliser, anti-caking agent
 Magnesium silicate – anti-caking agent
 Magnesium stearate – emulsifier, stabiliser
 Magnesium sulfate – mineral salt, acidity regulator, firming agent
 Mahleb –
 Malabathrum –
 Malic acid – acidity regulator
 Malt extract – flavor enhancer
 Maltitol – humectant, stabiliser
 Maltodextrin – carbohydrate sweetener
 Maltol – flavor enhancer
 Maltose –
 Mandarin oil-leavening agent
 Manganese –
 Mannitol – humectant, anti-caking agent, sweetener
 Margarine –
 Marjoram (Origanum majorana)
 Mastic –
 Meadowfoam seed oil – highly stable oil, with over 98% long-chain fatty acids. Competes with rapeseed oil for industrial applications. 
 Mega-purple – a Kosher food additive made from grapes
 Mentha arvensis oil/Mint oil, used in flavoring toothpastes, mouthwashes and pharmaceuticals, as well as in aromatherapy and other medicinal applications. 
 Metatartaric acid – food acid, emulsifier
 Methionine –
 Methyl butyrate –
 Methyl disulfide –
 Methyl ethyl cellulose – thickener, vegetable gum, emulsifier
 Methyl hexenoate –
 Methyl isobutyrate –
 Methylcellulose – thickener, emulsifier, vegetable gum
 Methylparaben (methyl para-hydroxybenzoate) – preservative
 Methyltheobromine –
 Microcrystalline cellulose – anti-caking agent
 Milk thistle (Silybum) –
 Milk –
 Mint (Mentha spp.) –
 Mixed acetic and tartaric acid esters of mono- and diglycerides of fatty acids – emulsifier
 Modified starch –
 Molasses extract –
 Molybdenum –
 Bergamot (Monarda didyma) –
 Mono- and diglycerides of Fatty acids – emulsifier
 Monoammonium glutamate – flavor enhancer
 Monopotassium glutamate – flavor enhancer
 Monosodium glutamate (MSG) – flavor enhancer
 Monostarch phosphate – thickener, vegetable gum
 Montanic acid esters – humectant
 Mullein (Verbascum thapsus)
 Mustard –
 Mustard oil (essential oil), containing a high percentage of allyl isothiocyanate or other isothiocyanates, depending on the species of mustard
 Mustard oil (pressed) – used in India as a cooking oil. Also used as a massage oil.
 Mustard plant –
 Mustard seed –

N 
 Natamycin – preservative
 Neohesperidin dihydrochalcone – artificial sweetener
 Niacin (vitamin B3) – color retention agent
 nicotinic acid (vitamin B3) – color retention agent
 Nicotinamide (vitamin B3) – color retention agent
 Nigella (Kolanji, Black caraway) –
 Nisin – preservative
 Nitrogen – propellant
 Nitrous oxide – propellant
 Norbixin – color
 Nordihydroguaiaretic acid - antioxidant. Banned as a food additive since the early 1960s.
 Nutmeg –

O 
 Octyl gallate – antioxidant, preservative
 Evening primrose (Oenothera biennis et al.) –
 Okra oil (Hibiscus seed oil) – from the seed of the Hibiscus esculentus. Composed predominantly of oleic and lanoleic acids.
 Oleomargarine –
 Olive oil – used in cooking – cosmetics – soaps and as a fuel for traditional oil lamps
 Orange GGN – color (orange)
 Orange oil – like lemon oil – cold pressed rather than distilled. Consists of 90% d-Limonene. Used as a fragrance, in cleaning products and in flavoring foods. 
 Orcein – color (red)
 Orchil – color (red)
 Oregano (Origanum vulgare, O. heracleoticum, and other species) –
 Oregano oil – contains thymol and carvacrol
 Orris root –
 Orthophenyl phenol – preservative
 Oxidised polyethylene wax – humectant
 Oxidised starch – thickener, vegetable gum
 Oxystearin – antioxidant, sequestrant

P 
 Palm oil – the most widely produced tropical oil. Also used to make biofuel.
 Panax ginseng –
 Panax quinquefolius –
 Ponch phoran –
 Pandan leaf –
 Pantothenic acid (Vitamin B5) –
 Papain – A cysteine protease hydrolase enzyme present in papaya (Carica papaya) and mountain papaya (Vasconcellea cundinamarcensis).
 Paprika red
 Paprika –
 Paprika extract –
 Paraffins – glazing agent
 Parsley (Petroselinum crispum) –
 Patent blue V – color (blue)
 Peanut oil/Ground nut oil – mild-flavored cooking oil.
 Pecan oil – valued as a food oil, but requiring fresh pecans for good quality oil. 
 Pectin – vegetable gum, emulsifier
 Perilla seed oil – high in omega-3 fatty acids. Used as an edible oil, for medicinal purposes, in skin care products and as a drying oil.
 Phosphated distarch phosphate – thickener, vegetable gum
 Phosphoric acid – food acid
 Phytic acid – preservative
 Pigment Rubine – color
 Pimaricin – preservative
 Pine needle oil
 Pine seed oil – an expensive food oil, used in salads and as a condiment. 
 Pistachio oil – strongly flavored oil, particularly for use in salads. 
 Prune kernel oil – marketed as a gourmet cooking oil 
 Poly vinyl pyrrolidone –
 Polydextrose – humectant
 Polyethylene glycol 8000 – antifoaming agent
 Polyglycerol esters of fatty acids – emulsifier
 Polyglycerol polyricinoleate – emulsifier
 Polymethylsiloxane – antifoaming agent
 Polyoxyethylene (40) stearate – emulsifier
 Polyoxyethylene (8) stearate – emulsifier, stabilizer
 Polyphosphates – mineral salt, emulsifier
 Polysorbate 20 – emulsifier
 Polysorbate 40 – emulsifier
 Polysorbate 60 – emulsifier
 Polysorbate 65 – emulsifier
 Polysorbate 80 – emulsifier
 Polyvinylpolypyrrolidone – color stabiliser
 Pomegranate seeds (though some consider these a fruit, not a spice)
 Ponceau 4R – color (FDA: Ext D&C Red #8)
 Ponceau 6R – color
 Ponceau SX – color
 Poppy seed –
 Poppyseed oil – used for cooking, moisturizing skin, and in paints, varnishes and soaps.
 Potassium acetates – preservative, acidity regulator
 Potassium adipate – food acid
 Potassium alginate – thickener, vegetable gum, stabilizer, gelling agent, emulsifier
 Potassium aluminium silicate – anti-caking agent
 Potassium ascorbate – antioxidant (water-soluble)
 Potassium benzoate – preservative
 Potassium bicarbonate – mineral salt
 Potassium bisulfite – preservative, antioxidant
 Potassium bromate – flour treatment agent
 Potassium carbonate – mineral salt
 Potassium chloride – mineral salt
 Potassium citrates – food acid
 Potassium ferrocyanide – anti-caking agent
 Potassium fumarate – food acid
 Potassium gluconate – stabiliser
 Potassium hydrogen sulfite – preservative, antioxidant
 Potassium hydroxide – mineral salt
 Potassium lactate – food acid
 Potassium malate – food acid
 Potassium metabisulfite – preservative, antioxidant
 Potassium nitrate – preservative, color fixative
 Potassium nitrite – preservative, color fixative
 Potassium phosphates – mineral salt
 Potassium propionate – preservative
 Potassium salts of fatty acids – emulsifier, stabiliser, anti-caking agent
 Potassium sodium tartrate – food acid
 Potassium sorbate – preservative
 Potassium sulfate – mineral salt, seasoning
 Potassium sulfite – preservative, antioxidant
 Potassium tartrates – food acid
 Powdered Cellulose – anti-caking agent
 Primrose (Primula) — candied flowers, tea
 Processed Eucheuma seaweed – thickener, vegetable gum, stabilizer, gelling agent, emulsifier
 Propane-1,2-diol alginate – thickener, vegetable gum, stabilizer, emulsifier
 Propionic acid – preservative
 Propyl gallate – antioxidant
 Propylene glycol – humectant
 Propylene glycol alginate – thickener, vegetable gum, stabilizer, emulsifier
 Propylene glycol esters of fatty acids – emulsifier
 Propylparaben (propyl para-hydroxybenzoate) – preservative
 Pumpkin seed oil – a specialty cooking oil, produced in Austria and Slovenia. Doesn't tolerate high temperatures.
 Pulegone
 Purslane –
 Pyridoxine hydrochloride (Vitamin B6) –

Q 
 Quatre épices –
 Quillaia extract – humectant
 Quinoa oil – similar in composition and use to corn oil
 Quinoline Yellow WS – color (yellow and orange) (FDA: D&C Yellow #10)

R 
 Ramtil oil – pressed from the seeds of the one of several species of genus Guizotia abyssinica (Niger pea) in India and Ethiopia. Used for both cooking and lighting.
 Ras-el hanout
 Raspberry (leaves)
 Red 2G – color
 Refined microcrystalline wax – glazing agent
 Rhodoxanthin – color
 Riboflavin (vitamin B2) – color (yellow and orange)
 Rice bran oil – suitable for high temperature cooking. Widely used in Asia.
 Rosemary (Rosmarinus officinalis) –
 Rubixanthin – color

S 
 Saccharin – artificial sweetener
 Safflower oil – a flavorless and colorless cooking oil.
 Safflower –
 Saffron – color
 Saigon Cinnamon –
 Salad Burnet (Sanguisorba minor or Poterium sanguisorba)
 Salt –
 Sandalwood – color
 Savory (Satureja hortensis, S. montana)
 Scarlet GN – color
 Sesame oil – used as a cooking oil, and as a massage oil, particularly in India.
 Sesame seed –
 Shellac – glazing agent
 Sichuan pepper (Xanthoxylum piperitum) –
 Silicon dioxide – anti-caking agent
 Silver – color (silver)
 Luohanguo
 Sodium acetate – preservative, acidity regulator
 Sodium adipate – food acid
 Sodium alginate – thickener, vegetable gum, stabilizer, gelling agent, emulsifier
 Sodium aluminium phosphate – acidity regulator, emulsifier
 Sodium aluminosilicate (sodium aluminium silicate) – anti-caking agent
 Sodium ascorbate – antioxidant (water-soluble)
 Sodium benzoate – preservative
 Sodium bicarbonate – mineral salt
 Sodium bisulfite (sodium hydrogen sulfite) – preservative, antioxidant
 Sodium carbonate – mineral salt
 Sodium carboxymethylcellulose – emulsifier
 Sodium citrates – food acid
 Sodium dehydroacetate – preservative
 Sodium erythorbate – antioxidant
 Sodium erythorbin – antioxidant
 Sodium ethyl para-hydroxybenzoate – preservative
 Sodium ferrocyanide – anti-caking agent
 Sodium formate – preservative
 Sodium fumarate – food acid
 Sodium gluconate – stabiliser
 Sodium hydrogen acetate – preservative, acidity regulator
 Sodium hydroxide – mineral salt
 Sodium lactate – food acid
 Sodium malates – food acid
 Sodium metabisulfite – preservative, antioxidant, bleaching agent
 Sodium methyl para-hydroxybenzoate – preservative
 Sodium nitrate – preservative, color fixative
 Sodium nitrite – preservative, color fixative
 Sodium orthophenyl phenol – preservative
 Sodium propionate – preservative
 Sodium propyl para-hydroxybenzoate – preservative
 Sodium sorbate – preservative
 Sodium stearoyl lactylate – emulsifier
 Sodium succinates – acidity regulator, flavor enhancer
 Sodium salts of fatty acids – emulsifier, stabiliser, anti-caking agent
 Sodium sulfite – mineral salt, preservative, antioxidant
 Sodium sulfite – preservative, antioxidant
 Sodium tartrates – food acid
 Sodium tetraborate – preservative
 Sorbic acid – preservative
 Sorbitan monolaurate – emulsifier
 Sorbitan monooleate – emulsifier
 Sorbitan monopalmitate – emulsifier
 Sorbitan monostearate – emulsifier
 Sorbitan tristearate – emulsifier
 Sorbitol – humectant, emulsifier, sweetener
 Sorbol –
 Sorrel (Rumex spp.) –
 Soybean oil – accounts for about half of worldwide edible oil production.
 Spearmint oil – often used in flavoring mouthwash and chewing gum, among other applications.
 Star anise –
 Star anise oil – highly fragrant oil using in cooking. Also used in perfumery and soaps, has been used in toothpastes, mouthwashes, and skin creams. 90% of the world's star anise crop is used in the manufacture of Tamiflu, a drug used to treat avian flu.
 Starch sodium octenylsuccinate – thickener, vegetable gum
 Stearic acid – anti-caking agent
 Stearyl tartarate – emulsifier
 Succinic acid – food acid
 Sucralose – artificial sweetener
 Sucroglycerides – emulsifier
 Sucrose acetate isobutyrate – emulsifier, stabiliser
 Sucrose esters of fatty acids – emulsifier
 Sugar –
 Sulfur dioxide – preservative, antioxidant
 Sulfuric acid – acidity regulator
 Sumac –
 Sunflower oil – a common cooking oil, also used to make biodiesel.
 Sunset Yellow FCF – color (yellow and orange) (FDA: FD&C Yellow #6)
 Sweet basil –
 Sweet woodruff –

T 
 Talc – anti-caking agent
 Tamarind –
 Tanacetum balsamita / Costmary –
 Tandoori masala –
 Tannins – color, emulsifier, stabiliser, thickener
 Tansy –
 Tara gum – thickener, vegetable gum, stabilizer
 Tarragon (Artemisia dracunculus) –
 Tartaric acid esters of mono- and diglycerides of fatty acids – emulsifier
 Tartrazine – color (yellow and orange) (FDA: FD&C Yellow #5)
 Camellia oil/Tea oil, widely used in southern China as a cooking oil. Also used in making soaps, hair oils and a variety of other products.
 Tert-butylhydroquinone – antioxidant
 Tetrahydrocannabinol- flavor enhancer, potent anti-carcinogen
 Thaumatin – flavor enhancer, artificial sweetener
 Theine –
 Thermally oxidised soya bean oil – emulsifier
 Thiabendazole – preservative
 Thiamine (Vitamin B1) –
 Thiodipropionic acid – antioxidant
 Thujaplicins – preservatives registered in Japan
 Thyme –
 stannous chloride – color retention agent, antioxidant
 Titanium dioxide – color (white)
 Tocopherol (Vitamin E) –
 Tocopherol concentrate (natural) – antioxidant
 Tragacanth – thickener, vegetable gum, stabilizer, emulsifier
 Triacetin – humectant
 Triammonium citrate – food acid
 Triethyl citrate – thickener, vegetable gum
 Trimethylxanthine –
 Triphosphates – mineral salt, emulsifier
 Trisodium phosphate – mineral salt, antioxidant
 Turmeric – color (yellow and orange)

V 
 Vanilla (Vanilla planifolia) –
 Vegetable carbon – color (brown and black)
 Vinegar –
 Violaxanthin – color
 Vitamin –
 Vitamin A (Retinol) –
 Vitamin B1 (Thiamine) –
 Vitamin B2 (Riboflavin) –
 Vitamin B5 (Pantothenic acid) –
 Vitamin B6 (Pyrodoxine) –
 Vitamin B12 (Cyanocobalamin) –
 Vitamin C (Ascorbic acid) –
 Vitamin D (Calciferol) –
 Vitamin E (Tocopherol) –
 Vitamin K (Potassium) –

W 
 Walnut oil – used for its flavor, also used by Renaissance painters in oil paints
 Wasabi –
 Water –
 Wattleseed –

X 
 Xanthan gum – thickener, vegetable gum, stabilizer
 Xylitol – humectant, stabiliser

Y 
 Yellow 2G – color (yellow and orange)
 Yucca extract –

Z 
 Zeaxanthin – color
 Zinc acetate – flavor enhancer

See also 
 Food Chemicals Codex
 List of additives in cigarettes
 List of food additives, Codex Alimentarius
 List of unrefined sweeteners
 List of phytochemicals in food

References

External links
 Food Additive Status List | FDA
 Australian Food Additive Codes

European Union food law
Additives
Food additives
Food additives